Nii Odoi Mensah (died 3 December 2016) was a Ghanaian actor. He was the president of the Ghana Actors Guild.

Filmography
 My Mother's Heart (2005)
 6 Hours To Christmas (2010)
Agony of Christ

See also 

 Eddie Coffie

References

Ghanaian male actors
2016 deaths
Year of birth missing